Shelley Ann Harland-Wright (born as Shelley Ann Harland, ca. 1979, Caterham, Surrey) is an English singer-songwriter and producer. In 1997, she started her music career in New York and performed mononymously as Harland. By 2006, she was based in Australia and released material as Shelley Harland.

Biography
Shelley Ann Harland was born in about 1979 and grew up in Caterham, Surrey. While growing up, she did not receive any musical training; however, she developed a love and a taste for music and would make up songs with a keyboard she had at home. In 1997, Harland finished her secondary education and started working as a beauty therapist. In that year, she met an Australian guitarist-singer-songwriter, James Wright, and they developed a domestic partnership. The couple moved to New York where initially Harland worked as a private investigator while Wright performed in his band, Stretch Princess. She later recalled "[James] was on tour and one day I just picked up his guitar and just started playing it ... It was an immediate and natural thing. I started to play and now I can't imagine not doing it. It's like breathing – music – it's who I am. It was fate".

Harland started to write songs with an acoustic guitar and a four-track record sampler. She collaborated with Andrew Wright, James' brother, a programmer and producer. In 1999, Harland and Andrew formed Phoelar and issued an album of the same name, which was recorded in Sydney with Andrew producing. Its music style was orientated towards electronic and trip-hop sounds. Justin Elswick of Review Digest found that Phoelar was "more experimental and somewhat darker" than Harland's later work. He noted that "'Lovers Greed' is a fantastic track that captures the creamy and urban vibe of a Quarterflash or The Motels song". All the tracks were co-written by Harland and Andrew.

In 2003, Harland released her first two albums under the mononym Harland but after that used her full name.

By 2006, Shelley and James Wright had moved to Sydney. She released her fourth album, Red Leaf, in 2009. It featured predominantly acoustic and pop sounds, in contrast with her previous electronic works. Four singles were lifted from it: "Wonder", "Friday", "Stranger" and "In the Dark". Harland recorded her fifth album, The Girl Who Cried Wolf, after launching a fundraising campaign. The song "New Things" was released as a single.

In 2013, her song "In the Dark" (from the Red Leaf album) was chosen for the advertising campaign for the new Omega Ladymatic Watch, featuring actress Nicole Kidman. Harland also performed at the launch event La nuit enchantée, which took place at the Stadpalais Liechtenstein in Vienna.

Since the start of her career, Harland has collaborated with many artists from the world of electronic music, such as Delerium, Ferry Corsten, Pole Folder, Loverush UK!, Sleepthief, Headstrong, Morgan Page, Junkie XL and Guru/Jazzmatazz. She toured with Delerium, The Fray and Elvis Costello.

Discography

Collaborations

References

External links 
 
 http://poptrashaddicts.blogspot.it/2009/08/shelley-harland-interview_18.html
 http://www.1mix.co.uk/news/670-interview-with-shelley-harland.html
 http://www.ivibes.nu/index.php?article=2798
 http://www.musicaldiscoveries.com/reviews/shelleyharland.htm

Living people
Australian women singers
Year of birth missing (living people)